Amud or Amoud is an ancient, ruined town in the Awdal region of Somaliland. Named after its patron Saint Amud it was a center of activity during the Golden Age of the Adal Kingdom.

Overview

The historian G.W.B. Huntingford (1930) gives a detailed description of the ancient town in The town of Amud, Somaliland:

"The house are scattered around without any apparent plan; there are no streets and no trace of a surrounding wall. There is a mosque in the southern half of the dwelling area... [with a] rather oddly built mihrab facing the entrance... and immediately to the south... is the cemetery. There are upwards of two hundred houses, all well-built of stone [and] as much as 2.6m in height... The number of rooms ranges from two to four... there is sometimes no sign of an entrance to the inner rooms. This implies that entry was made from the roof, which was doubtless flat and reached by teps now vanished... There are many niches or cupboards in the inner walls."

Amud is situated over 1,000 m above sea level. The old town contained over 200 houses, each built with stone walls and mason ranging from single room to multi-roomed courtyard houses. Niches were cut in the walls for storage, and they were roofed with brushwood laid over wooden rafters. The mosques were more ambitiously planned.

The old section of Amud spans  and contains hundreds of ancient ruins of multi-roomed courtyard houses, stone walls, complex mosques, and other archaeological remains, including intricate colored glass bracelets and Chinese ceramics.

According to Sonia Mary Cole, the town features 250 to 300 houses and an ancient temple. The temple was constructed from carefully dressed stone, and was later transformed into a mosque. It also features pottery lamps. Altogether, the building techniques, among other factors, point to a close association with Aksumite archaeological sites from the 2nd to 5th centuries AD.

Curle in 1937 identified jars in Amud resembling honey jars still common in Harar however no longer used in Somaliland. 

Amud is home to several historic pilgrimage sites belonging to celebrated Somali Saints, the most prominent being Saint Sau, Saint Amud and Saint Sharlagamadi, some sources associate these Saints with a proto-Somali ethnic group that lived in the region, where another source associates Amud with the Harla people. Another source states that Amud was an Aksumite town. During his research in the area, the historian G.W.B. Huntingford noticed that whenever a historic site had the prefix Aw in its name (such as the ruins of Awbare and Awbube), it denoted the final resting place of a local Saint. The patron Saint Amud is buried in the vicinity of the ancient town.

The Amoud University in Borama is named after the archaeological site.

Demographics

The region around the ancient town and university is inhabited by the Faarah Nuur, one of the two sub divisions of Reer Nuur, a subclan of the Gadabuursi Dir clan.

See also
Maduna
Amoud University
Yubbe

Notes

External links
"The town of Amud, Somalia", by G.W.B. Huntingford

Cities of the Adal Sultanate
Archaeological sites in Somaliland